The Last Wright is an American documentary film released in 2008. It focuses on the only surviving hotel designed by Frank Lloyd Wright. It was produced by Travelfilm Company and McMar, Ltd/28 and was produced and written by Garry McGee and Lucille Carra and directed by Lucille Carra. Researched and filmed over a seven-year period, the film is the only video record of the distressed condition of the hotel. The film explores the history of the Mason City Bank and Hotel Commission (1908) as well as the struggles of the rural city of Mason City, Iowa to restore the Park Inn Hotel, which, along with the City National Bank, was a rare example of a Prairie School style mixed-use structure by Wright.

Taking a highly contextual approach, the film deals in depth with the changing social, cultural and economic conditions in Mason City from 1908 to the present, which places the hotel's decline in historical context. The narrative occasionally travels away from the Mason City story and compares the degraded Park Inn Hotel to familiar Wright masterpieces, including the Solomon R. Guggenheim Museum, Oak Park Wright residences, The Lowell E. Walter House (Cedar Rock) in Quasqueton, Iowa. Comparisons are made to demolished Wright hotels and to the partially restored Imperial Hotel, Tokyo, now moved to Meiji Mura Museum.

References

External links 
  
  Architecture and the City Film Series, San Francisco  http://sfpl.org/index.php?pg=1000339801

Documentary films about architecture
American documentary films
Mason City, Iowa
Frank Lloyd Wright